Moechotypa jeanvoinei is a species of beetle in the family Cerambycidae. It was described by Pic in 1934. It is known from Vietnam.

References

jeanvoinei
Beetles described in 1934